Piastów is a town in Masovian Voivodeship, east-central Poland.

Piastów may also refer to:

Piastów, Garwolin County, a village in Masovian Voivodeship, east-central Poland
Piastów, Przasnysz County, a village in Masovian Voivodeship, east-central Poland
Piastów, Radom County, a village in Masovian Voivodeship, east-central Poland